Boleslaus of Masovia  may refer to:
 Boleslaus IV of Poland (1122–1173), Duke of Masovia and Kujavia
 Boleslaus I of Masovia (1208–1248), of Masovian Piast descent
 Boleslaus II of Masovia (1251–1313), of Masovian Piast descent
 Boleslaus George II of Halych (1308–1340), of Masovian Piast descent
 Boleslaus III of Plock (1322–1351)
 Boleslaus III of Masovia (1385–1428)
 Boleslaus IV of Masovia (1421–1454)
 Boleslaus V of Masovia (died 1488)